Leufroyia erronea is a species of sea snail, a marine gastropod mollusk in the family Raphitomidae.

Description

Distribution
Entire Mediterranean and NE Atlantic from Scotland to Canary Islands

References

External links
 Monterosato T. A. (di) (1884). Nomenclatura generica e specifica di alcune conchiglie mediterranee. Palermo, Virzi, 152 pp
 Fassio, G.; Russini, V.; Pusateri, F.; Giannuzzi-Savelli, R.; Høisæter, T.; Puillandre, N.; Modica, M. V.; Oliverio, M. (2019). An assessment of Raphitoma and allied genera (Neogastropoda: Raphitomidae). Journal of Molluscan Studies

erronea
Gastropods described in 1884